The Circle Tour is a worldwide concert tour by American rock band Bon Jovi. The tour promoted the band's 11th studio album The Circle (2009). Starting in North America in early 2010, the tour progressed to Europe, South America, Asia and Australia before the year's end. It included a 12 night run at the O2 Arena in London and four nights in East Rutherford, New Jersey to celebrate the grand opening of the Meadowlands Stadium.  The tour was the #1 top-grossing concert tour for 2010 in the United States.

Bon Jovi also played a special free performance for fans and former season ticket holders of the Jon Bon Jovi-owned arena football team The Philadelphia Soul on March 24 at 5:00pm a few hours before the band's show at Philadelphia's Wachovia Center. The band ended the first year of the tour in Australasia, playing two shows in New Zealand and eight shows in Australia including a VIP-ONLY gig on December 15 at Star City Casino.

Background
Bon Jovi kicked off the stadium leg of the Circle Tour by making history – they played the first ever show at the brand new New Meadowlands Stadium in East Rutherford, New Jersey.  The three sold-out shows on May 26, 27, and 29, 2010 were a huge success, that they prompted the addition of another tour date at the stadium – on July 9, 2010 (the start of the 2nd North American leg)

Bon Jovi played a special free performance for fans and former season ticket holders of the Jon Bon Jovi-owned arena football team The Philadelphia Soul on Wednesday, March 24, 2010, a few hours before the band's show at Philadelphia's Wachovia Center. They also
became the first band ever to play on the roof of the O2 Arena in London, England on June 7, 2010. Around 1,500 people were there to see the amazing stunt on a large TV outside with a large PA system. Trained mountaineers helped the group to reach the top of the roof, which stands at 58 meters above the ground.

This tour featured a circle-shaped stage and five massive ABB robotsprovided by RoboScreen and designed by Andy Flessas, are each complete with a 6' by 9' Nocturne/ Vidicon LED screen attached to their "articulated arms", and are choreographed to move with the music and onstage production.

Opening acts
Bon Jovi held a contest, called SuperBAND Tonight, for North American bands to compete to get a chance to perform as their opening act for some major concerts.  They announced the winners of the contest in a press release.  A list of the winners, their show dates, and more information about the contest can be found at:  Bon Jovi's The Circle Tour Announces Winners of Contest.

Dashboard Confessional supported the February, March and some of the April dates.
Fuel supported the Hersheypark Stadium show on May 19
Kid Rock supported the O2 Arena shows on June 22, 23, 25 and 26.
OneRepublic supported the O2 Arena shows on June 17, 19 and 20.
Kid Rock supported on July 9, 15, 17, 20, 21, 24, 28, 30 and 31.
Train was the special guest on the first night at the Meadowlands Stadium. Gavin DeGraw was the special guest for the second night, and OneRepublic was the special guest on the third.

Setlist 

Blood on Blood
We Weren't Born to Follow
You Give Love a Bad Name
Born to Be My Baby
Lost Highway     
Whole Lot of Leavin'                               
When We Were Beautiful
Superman Tonight
We Got It Goin' On
I'll Sleep When I'm Dead
Bad Medicine (with snippets of Shout)
It's My Life
Lay Your Hands on Me (Richie Sambora on lead vocals)
(You Want to) Make a Memory
Bed of Roses
I'll Be There For You
Someday I'll Be Saturday Night (acoustic)
Keep the Faith
Work for the Working Man
Who Says You Can't Go Home
Love's the Only Rule
Encore:
Runaway
Wanted Dead or Alive
Livin' on a Prayer

Tour dates

Personnel

Bon Jovi
Jon Bon Jovi – lead vocals, guitar, maracas for Keep the Faith and Bullet, tambourine for Hey God
Richie Sambora – lead guitar, lead vocals for Lay Your Hands on Me, backing vocals, talk box
Hugh McDonald – bass, backing vocals
Tico Torres – drums, percussion, backing vocals for Love For Sale
David Bryan – keyboards, backing vocals

Additional personnel
Bobby Bandiera – rhythm guitar, backing vocals
Jeff Kazee – Hammond organ, keyboards, backing vocals (one-off show in March and another show in June as a substitute for David Bryan who was attending the Tony Awards)

Notes

References

Bon Jovi concert tours
2010 concert tours